Cantrainea yoyottei is a species of sea snail, a marine gastropod mollusk in the family Colloniidae.

Description
The shell grows to a height of 23 mm.

Distribution
This marine species occurs in the Lesser Antilles off Guadeloupe.

References

 Vilvens, C., 2001. Description of a new species of Cantrainea (Gastropoda: Turbinidae: Colloniinae) from Guadeloupe. Novapex 2(4): 153-156

External links

Colloniidae
Gastropods described in 2001